Alternative medicine degrees include academic degrees, first professional degrees, qualifications or diplomas issued by accredited and legally recognised academic institutions in alternative medicine or related areas, either human or animal.

Examples

Examples of alternative medicine degrees include:
 Ayurveda - BSc, MSc, BAMC, MD(Ayurveda), M.S.(Ayurveda), Ph.D(Ayurveda)
Siddha medicine - BSMS, MD(Siddha), Ph.D(Siddha)
 Acupuncture - BSc, LAc, DAc, AP, DiplAc, MAc
 Herbalism - Acs, BSc, Msc.
 Homeopathy - BSc, MSc, DHMs, BHMS, M.D. (HOM), PhD in homoeopathy
 Naprapathy - DN
 Naturopathic medicine - BSc, MSc, BNYS, MD (Naturopathy), ND, NMD
 Oriental Medicine - BSc, MSOM, MSTOM, KMD (Korea), BCM (Hong Kong), MCM (Hong Kong), BChinMed (Hong Kong), MChinMed (Hong Kong), MD (Taiwan), MB (China), TCM-Traditional Chinese medicine master (China)
 Osteopathy - BOst, BOstMed, BSc (Osteo), DipOsteo

References

 

Alternative medicine